Pseudocyclotus is a genus of minute salt marsh snails with an operculum, terrestrial gastropod mollusks in the subfamily Omphalotropidinae  of the family Assimineidae.

Species
 Pseudocyclotus absconditus (C. R. Boettger, 1922)
 Pseudocyclotus acanthoderma (Tapparone Canefri, 1886)
 Pseudocyclotus buehleri I. Rensch, 1937
 Pseudocyclotus campanulatiformis Thiele, 1928
 Pseudocyclotus campanulatus (Schepman, 1919)
 Pseudocyclotus commixtus I. Rensch, 1937
 Pseudocyclotus coultasi Clench, 1957
 Pseudocyclotus crinitus Thiele, 1928
 Pseudocyclotus debilior Iredale, 1941
 Pseudocyclotus exiguus Iredale, 1941
 Pseudocyclotus flavus (Leschke, 1912)
 Pseudocyclotus globosus (E. A. Smith, 1897)
 Pseudocyclotus hermitensis Thiele, 1928
 Pseudocyclotus incendium Clench, 1957
 Pseudocyclotus infans (E. A. Smith, 1884)
 Pseudocyclotus laetus (Möllendorff, 1895)
 Pseudocyclotus levis (L. Pfeiffer, 1855)
 Pseudocyclotus liratulus (E. von Martens, 1864)
 Pseudocyclotus lorentzi (Schepman, 1919)
 Pseudocyclotus novaehiberniae (Quoy & Gaimard, 1832)
 Pseudocyclotus parvus (Hedley, 1891)
 Pseudocyclotus rugatellus (Tapparone Canefri, 1883)
 Pseudocyclotus rutilus van Benthem Jutting, 1963
 Pseudocyclotus tristis (Tapparone Canefri, 1883)
 Pseudocyclotus tunicatus (Tapparone Canefri, 1886)
 Pseudocyclotus wegneri van Benthem Jutting, 1959
Synonyms
 Pseudocyclotus cingulatus Leschke, 1912: synonym of Pseudocyclotus novaehiberniae (Quoy & Gaimard, 1832) (junior synonym)
 Pseudocyclotus lieftincki van Benthem Jutting, 1958: synonym of Dominamaria lieftincki (van Benthem Jutting, 1958) (original combination)

References

 Bank, R. A. (2017). Classification of the Recent freshwater/brackish Gastropoda of the World. Last update: January 24th, 2018. OpenAccess publication

External links
 Thiele, J. (1894). Ueber die Zungen einiger Landdeckelschnecken. Nachrichtsblatt der Deutschen Malakozoologischen Gesellschaft. 6(1-2): 23-25
 Tapparone Canefri, C. (1886). Fauna malacologica della Nuova Guinea i delle isole adiacenti. Parte I. - Molluschi estramarini. Supplemento 1. Annali del Museo civico di Storia Naturale di Genova, Series 2. 24: 113-200.
 Fukuda H. & Ponder W.F. 2003. Australian freshwater assimineids, with a synopsis of the Recent genus-group taxa of the Assimineidae (Mollusca: Caenogastropoda: Rissooidea). Journal of Natural History, 37: 1977-2032

Assimineidae